Christus factus est (Christ became obedient) is taken from Saint Paul's Epistle to the Philippians. It is a gradual in the Catholic liturgy of the mass. In the classical Roman rite, it was sung as the gradual at mass on Maundy Thursday, however since the promulgation of the new rite of mass by Pope Paul VI in 1969 it has been employed instead as the gradual on Palm Sunday. Up until 1970 it was also sung daily at the conclusion of Tenebrae (Matins and Lauds) on the last days of Holy Week. It appeared first at Tenebrae of Maundy Thursday, but was not recited in full, ending with ...'usque ad mortem'. The following day at Tenebrae of Good Friday it was sung from the beginning until ...'mortem autem crucis' and at Tenebrae of Holy Saturday it was sung in full. Up until the reform of the Holy Week liturgy promulgated by Pius XII in 1955 these Tenebrae services were sung in the late afternoon and evening of the previous day, and were well attended by the laity. Thus Tenebrae of Maundy Thursday was sung during the evening of Spy Wednesday; Tenebrae of Good Friday in the evening Maundy Thursday etc. For this reason Christus factus est (along with the famous Tenebrae responsories) was set by many composers of church music. From 1956–1969, and in the liturgical books of 1962 which are currently in use as the extraordinary form of the Roman Rite, these services have been 'restored' to the early morning of the last three days of Holy Week, with the effect that complex musical settings of this text are rarely heard in their authentic liturgical context.

Text 

In the Catholic liturgy it is used as Gregorian gradual on Palm Sunday, Maundy Thursday and Good Friday. The melody is found in the Graduale Romanum, 1974, p. 148. Over the centuries the text has been set to music by several composers.

Anton Bruckner set the text to music three times. He set it first in 1844 as the gradual of the Messe für den Gründonnerstag (WAB 9). The second setting Christus factus est, WAB 10 of 1873 is a motet in D minor for eight-voice mixed choir, 3 trombones, and double bass quintet ad libitum. The third setting Christus factus est, WAB 11 of 1884 is a motet for  choir a cappella in D minor. This third setting is, with Locus iste and Ave Maria, among Bruckner's most popular motets.

References

Sources 
 Anton Bruckner - Sämtliche Werke, Band 21: Kleine Kirchenmusikwerke, Musikwissenschaftlicher Verlag der Internationalen Bruckner-Gesellschaft, Hans Bauernfeind and Leopold Nowak (Eds.), Vienna, 1984
 Cornelis van Zwol, Anton Bruckner - Leven en Werken , Thoth, Bussum (Netherlands), 2012. 

Latin-language Christian hymns
Music for the Holy Week